Toby Barker (born December 31, 1981) is an American politician and the current Mayor of Hattiesburg, Mississippi. In 2007, he was elected a member of the Mississippi House of Representatives from the 102nd District. At the age of 25, Barker became the then-youngest legislator elected in Mississippi's history. He is a former member of the Republican Party. In 2017, Barker ran as an independent and defeated four-term incumbent Johnny DuPree to become Hattiesburg's 35th mayor.

Barker is a graduate of The University of Southern Mississippi with a Bachelor of Arts degree in Communications (2004) and a Master of Science degree in Economic Development (2006). He also holds a Master of Healthcare Leadership degree from Brown University (2015).

References

1981 births
21st-century American politicians
Living people
Mayors of Hattiesburg, Mississippi
Members of the Mississippi House of Representatives
Mississippi Republicans
People from Hattiesburg, Mississippi
People from Meridian, Mississippi
University of Southern Mississippi alumni
Mississippi Independents